Helminthoglypta allynsmithi, the Merced Canyon shoulderband or  Allyn Smith's banded snail, is a species of air-breathing land snail, a terrestrial pulmonate gastropod mollusc in the family Helminthoglyptidae. This species is endemic to the United States.

References

Endemic fauna of the United States
Molluscs of the United States
Helminthoglypta
Gastropods described in 1939
Taxonomy articles created by Polbot